The Sad and Tragic Demise of Big Fine Hot Salty Black Wind is the third album by free jazz ensemble Universal Congress Of, released on October 17, 1991 by Enemy Records.

Track listing

Personnel 
Adapted from The Sad and Tragic Demise of Big Fine Hot Salty Black Wind liner notes.

Universal Congress Of
 Joe Baiza – guitar, vocals, design
 Bob Fitzer – bass guitar
 Paul Lines – drums
 Steve Moss – tenor saxophone
Additional musicians
 Elliott Sharp – guitar (10, 11) 

Production and additional personnel
 Bryce Goggin – engineering
 Michael Knuth – production
 A.T. Michael MacDonald – mastering
 Devin Sarno – design
 Universal Congress Of – production

Release history

References

External links 
 

1991 albums
Universal Congress Of albums
Enemy Records albums